Alec Ethelbert Winstone (14 March 1879 – 29 March 1963) was an English cricketer. He played in 44 first-class matches for Gloucestershire between 1906 and 1909 as a right-handed lower-order batsman and an occasional right-arm slow bowler.

References

1879 births
1963 deaths
English cricketers
Gloucestershire cricketers
Cricketers from Bristol